Mahaska may refer to:

 Chief Mahaska, of the Native American Iowa tribe
 Mahaska, Kansas, United States
 Mahaska County, Iowa, United States
 USS Mahaska

pt:Mahaska